

 
On October 10, 1933, United Air Lines Trip 23, a Boeing 247 airliner operated by United Air Lines  and registered as  crashed near Chesterton, Indiana, United States. The transcontinental flight carried three crew and four passengers and originated in Newark, New Jersey, with its final destination in Oakland, California. It had already landed in Cleveland, and was headed to its next stop in Chicago when it exploded en route. All aboard died in the crash, which was caused by an on-board explosive device. A second explosion followed after the aircraft crashed. The crash scene was adjacent to a gravel road about  outside of Chesterton, centered in a wooded area on the Jackson Township farm of James Smiley.

Investigators combed through the debris and were confronted with unusual evidence; the toilet and baggage compartment had been smashed into fragments. Shards of metal riddled the inside of the toilet door, while the other side of the door was free of the metal fragments. The tail section had been severed just aft of the toilet and was found mostly intact almost a mile away from the main wreckage. 

The Federal Bureau of Investigation declassified 324 documents related to the investigation on November 16, 2017. It is notable for being the first proven act of air sabotage in the history of commercial aviation.

Incident
United States Bureau of Investigation investigator Melvin Purvis said, "Our investigation convinced me that the tragedy resulted from an explosion somewhere in the region of the baggage compartment in the rear of the aircraft. Everything in front of the compartment was blown forward, everything behind blown backward, and things at the side outward." He also noted that the gasoline tanks "were crushed in, showing [that] there was no explosion in them."

Investigation
Dr. Carl Davis of the Porter County coroner's office and experts from the Crime Detection Laboratory at Northwestern University examined evidence from the crash and concluded that it was caused by a bomb, with nitroglycerin as the probable explosive. One of the passengers was seen carrying a brown package onto the aircraft in Newark, but investigators found the package amidst the wreckage and ruled it out as the source of the explosion. Investigators found a rifle in the wreckage, but they determined that a passenger carried it aboard as luggage, as he was en route to a shoot at Chicago's North Shore Gun Club. No suspect was ever identified in this incident and it remains unsolved.

Pilot Captain Terrant, his co-pilot, stewardess Alice Scribner, and all four passengers were killed. Scribner was the first United stewardess to be killed in an aircraft crash.

See also

 List of accidents and incidents involving commercial aircraft
 List of firsts in aviation
 1933 in aviation

Notes

References

External links
 "Seven die as plane crashes in flames". (October 11, 1933) New York Times p. 1 (pay site)
 "Plane crash laid to blast in air". (October 12, 1933) New York Times p. 3 (pay site)
 "Seek 'bomber' of plane". (October 16, 1933) New York Times p. 7 (pay site)
  – includes names and addresses of the deceased

 

1933 in Indiana
1933 murders in the United States
20th-century mass murder in the United States
Accidents and incidents involving the Boeing 247
Airliner accidents and incidents in Indiana
Airliner bombings in the United States
Aviation accidents and incidents in the United States in 1933
Crimes in Indiana
Disasters in Indiana 
Improvised explosive device bombings in the United States
Mass murder in 1933
Murder in Indiana
October 1933 events
Porter County, Indiana
Chesterton Crash
Unsolved airliner bombings
Unsolved mass murders in the United States
Explosions in 1933